Donald James Mackinnon (1 November 1928 – 1 October 2017) was an English-born Australian politician.

He was born in London to the business executive and diplomat Donald Mackinnon (son of politician Donald Mackinnon) and Mary Hindle James. His uncle, Dan Mackinnon, became an Australian federal politician in the 1950s. Mackinnon was educated at St George's College in Buenos Aires and then at Geelong Grammar School. He attended the University of Melbourne, where he received a Bachelor of Science degree. He received a second such degree from Oxford University in 1953. From 1954, he worked as an executive with the Shell Oil Company. In 1976, he was elected to the Victorian Legislative Assembly for Box Hill for the Liberal Party. He was defeated in 1982.

References

1928 births
2017 deaths
Liberal Party of Australia members of the Parliament of Victoria
Members of the Victorian Legislative Assembly
People educated at Geelong Grammar School
British emigrants to Australia